Laurie is a unisex given name. Among males, it can be a short form (hypocorism) of Lawrence or Laurence. For females, it can be a short form of Lauren or Laura.

Laurie is the name of:

People

Women
 Laurie Allen, singer and musician, half of the Bobby & Laurie 1960s Australian singing duo
 Laurie Anderson (born 1947), American avant-garde artist, composer, musician and film director
 Laurie Halse Anderson (born 1961), American writer best known for children's and young adult novels
 Laurie Monnes Anderson (born 1945), American politician
 Laurie Baker (ice hockey) (born 1976), American hockey player
 Laurie Brown (broadcaster) (born 1957), Canadian television host
 Laurie Butler (born 1955), American chemist
 Laurie David (born 1958), American environmental activist
 Laurie Garrett (born 1951), American  Pulitzer Prize-winning science journalist and writer
 Laurie Graham (born 1960), Canadian retired downhill skier, member of several Halls of Fame
 Laurie Graham (novelist) (born 1947), English journalist, scriptwriter and novelist
 Laurie Heyer, American mathematician
 Laurie Hill (footballer, born 1970), American-born Mexican international soccer player
 Laurie Jussaume (born 1999), Canadian cyclist
 Laurie Metcalf (born 1955), American actress
 Laurie Penny (born 1986), English feminist columnist and author
 Laurie Scott (politician) (born 1963), Canadian politician
 Laurie Sue Brockway (born 1956), American journalist, author, and minister
 Laurie Gwen Shapiro (born 1966), American writer and filmmaker
 Laurie Tackett (born 1974), one of the perpetrators of the torture-murder of Shanda Sharer
 Laurie Walker (artist) (1962–2011), Canadian artist
 Laurie Wayburn (born 1954), American conservationist
 Laurie Williams (wheelchair basketball) (born 1993), British wheelchair basketball player

Men
 Laurie Allan (born 1943), English drummer
 Gerard Anderson (1889-1914), British hurdler
 Laurie Baker (1917–2007), British-born Indian architect
 Laurie Bell (footballer) (born 1992), English footballer
 Lawrence Bell (footballer) (1875-1933), Scottish footballer
 Laurie Brereton (born 1946), Australian politician
 Laurie Bristow (born 1963), British diplomat
 Laurie Brown (footballer) (1937-1998), British footballer and manager
 Laurie Brown (physicist) (born 1923), American theoretical physicist
 Laurie Ferguson (born 1952), Australian former politician
 Laurie Hill (footballer, born 1942) (1942–2014), Australian rules footballer 
 Laurie London (English musician, born January 19, 1944)
 Laurie Lynd (born 1959), Canadian screenwriter and director
 Laurie Scott (footballer) (1917–1999), English footballer
 Laurie Scott (ice hockey) (1896–1977), Canadian ice hockey player
 Laurie Spina (born 1963), Australian former rugby league footballer
 Laurie Taylor (disambiguation)
 Laurie Walker (footballer), (born 1989), English football goalkeeper
 Laurie Williams (cricketer) (1968–2002), West Indian cricketer

Fictional characters
 Laurie Forman, in the TV show That 70s Show
 The title character of the TV series Laurie Hill
 Laurie Strode, in the Halloween film series, played by Jamie Lee Curtis
 Laurie Partridge, in the TV series The Partridge Family, played by Susan Dey
 Theodore Lawrence, called Laurie, in the novel Little Women
 Laurie, from the animated reality TV show The Ridonculous Race
 Laurie, later named Laurie du Salador, in Raymond E Feist 's The Riftwar Cycle
 Annie Laurie McShane, called Laurie in Betty Smith's novel, A Tree Grows in Brooklyn

See also
 J. Laurie Snell (1925-2011), American mathematician
 Lauri (given name)
 Lori (given name), feminine name
 Lorrie, feminine given name

English-language masculine given names
English masculine given names
English feminine given names
English unisex given names
Hypocorisms